is the third single by Japanese pop singer Yuki Saito. It was ranked #4 on two charts and #5 on another.

History
"Hatsukoi" was released on August 21, 1985 as a 7-inch single vinyl record through Canyon Records. The single reached #4 on both the Oricon and The Hitchart Hot 30 charts, and #5 on The Best Ten chart. The B-side release was "Umi no Ehagaki". Both songs had lyrics written by Takashi Matsumoto, with Kyōhei Tsutsumi composing the songs and Satoshi Takebe arranging them.

The single sold 162,000 copies and included a small foldout pinup poster featuring Saito in a yukata. It was later rereleased as a mini CD single on April 29, 1988.

Chart history

Track listing

Notes

References

1985 singles
Japanese-language songs
Yuki Saito (actress) songs
Songs with lyrics by Takashi Matsumoto (lyricist)
Songs with music by Kyōhei Tsutsumi
1985 songs